Potash Creek flows into the Black River near Naumburg, New York.

References 

Lakes of Lewis County, New York